The 1st Annual TV Week Logie Awards (as they would come to be known) were the first awards ever to be awarded for work within the Australian television industry. Television had begun production in Australia only three years earlier, in 1956.

Synopsis 
Although other cities had television (Sydney since its inception in 1956), the awards were for Melbourne television only. 

In 1959 the awards were given out during an episode of In Melbourne Tonight, with international star Googie Withers appearing as a guest host. Awards were given in only eight categories, two of which were for American programmes.

Awards

TV Star of the Year 
The most prestigious award was the TV Star of the Year Award, which the following year in 1960 would become renamed as the Gold Logie. The star of the year was awarded to Graham Kennedy and Panda Lisner for their program In Melbourne Tonight, for the Nine Network (GTV-9).

National
TV Show of the Year
Winner:
In Melbourne Tonight, GTV-9

Most Popular Children's Show
Winner:
The Happy Show, GTV-9

Most Popular Overseas Variety Show
Winner:
The Perry Como Show. Como was presented with his award by George McCadden, the chief of TV Week'''s American office, in New York City on 11 April 1959.

Most Popular Overseas DramaWinner:Perry MasonOutstanding Sports PresentationWinner:ABC Melbourne's Sporting Department for their coverage of events such as the Davis Cup, Test Cricket and the Australian Tennis Open

Outstanding PerformanceWinner:Bill Collins, Sunnyside Up'', HSV-7

External links

Australian Television: 1959-1961 Logie Awards
TV Week Logie Awards: 1959

1959 in Australian television
1959 television awards
1959